Bleier is a surname. Notable persons with the surname include:

 Bob Bleier (born 1964),  American football quarterback
 Edward Bleier (born 1929), American television executive
 Kimberly Anne Bleier, the 1983 Miss U.S. International
 Richard Bleier (born 1987), American baseball pitcher
 Rocky Bleier (born 1946), American football running back
 Ruth Bleier (1923–1988),  American neurophysiologist
 Sheffy Bleier (born c. 1964), Israeli photographer and educator

See also
 
 Bleiler
 Bleyer